Pterocalla plumitarsis is a species of ulidiid or picture-winged fly in the genus Pterocalla of the family Ulidiidae.

References

plumitarsis
Insects described in 1909